Heyland is a surname. Notable people with the surname include:

Jean-Christophe Heyland (1791–1866), Swiss engraver, watercolourist, and illustrator 
Michael Heyland, British theatre director and actor
Rob Heyland (born 1954), British actor and television writer

See also
Heyland diagram, a type of circle diagram